La Cordillera Reef (Spanish: Arrecifes de La Cordillera) is a nature reserve located 1.5 nautical miles from Fajardo, Puerto Rico consisting of a small archipelago of keys (called the Cordillera Keys or Cayos de La Cordillera), coral reefs and rocky islets. The nature reserve covers about 18 nautical miles and almost 30,000 acres between Cape San Juan (Las Cabezas de San Juan) in Cabezas, Fajardo and the island of Culebra. With the exception of Palomino and Lobos Key which are privately owned, all islands, reefs and keys are protected by the marine reserve. The total land area of the reserve is 224 cuerdas (218 acres). The nature reserve is also important for local fishermen, and eastern coastal municipalities such as Fajardo, Ceiba and Naguabo depend on the reserve for their fishing industries.

History 
Before its preservation, Cayo Icacos was important for the extraction of limestone for use in the sugarcane industry and construction in Puerto Rico. The conservation area that today encompasses La Cordillera Reef Nature Reserve was first designated on January 2, 1980, by the Coastal Zone Management Plan (Spanish: Plan de Manejo de la Zona Costanera) with the goal of preserving the coral reefs and marine habitats surrounding the Cordillera Keys, a small reef archipelago consisting of keys such as Icacos Key, Ratones Key, Lobos Key, La Blanquilla Reef, Diablo Key and Isla Palomino. Other protected landforms and reefs include Los Farallones, Barriles and Hermanos Reefs.

Administration over the nature reserve was transferred to the Puerto Rico Department of Natural and Environmental Resources (DRNA) in 1991. Management plans included the preservation of important bird nesting areas in some of the keys and the establishment of a marine wildlife refuge for the protection of endangered species such as green sea turtles and West Indian manatees. La Cordillera Reef is considered today a prime eco-tourist destination where visitors can swim along coral reefs and visit the beaches located in some of the keys, particularly Icacos.

Ecology 
Some of the marine ecosystems found within the reserve are coral reefs, sandy seashores, and extensive seagrass prairies which are important for sea turtles and manatees. La Cordillera Reef is also one of the largest preserved coral areas in the territory of Puerto Rico; the reefs are of high importance due to their high coverage of living coral. The three types of coral reef found in the reserve are rocky reef, consisting of coral growing on aeolianite and cemented sand, barrier reef, consisting of coral growing along keys and coastlines, and patch reef, consisting of patches of coral colonies growing on sandy seafloor. Some of the most common types of coral found in the area are Montastraea, Diploria, Acropora, Colpophyllia and Porites.

Fauna 
There are more than 83 documented fish species in the reserve, 33 of which are of importance for the regional fishing industry. The spiny lobster (Panulirus argus) and the queen conch (Strombus gigas) are also important species for fishing. The reserve also sustains keystone species that are responsible for important ecological processes such as "reef cleaning" which allows for the settlement, development and growth of new coral polyps; one of these keystone species is the black urchin (Diadema antillarum). In addition to the submerged fauna, this reserve is an important bird area with species such as the brown noddy (Anous stolidus), the bridled tern (Sterna anaethetus), the sooty tern (Sterna fuscata), the brown booby (Sula leucogaster), the laughing gull (Larus atricilla) and the roseate tern (Sterna dougalli), all of which are protected on the territorial and federal level. Humpback whales are also common throughout the winter months of December, January and February.

Flora 
The most important flora in the reserve is the seagrass Thalassia testudinum and Syringodium filiforme, which form important seagrass prairies that sustain many marine species such as turtles and manatees. This ecosystem sustains one of the largest manatee populations in the archipelago of Puerto Rico.

See also 
 Protected areas of Puerto Rico

References 

Coral reefs of the United States
Protected areas of Puerto Rico
Reefs of the Atlantic Ocean
Tourist attractions in Puerto Rico
Fajardo, Puerto Rico
1978 establishments in Puerto Rico
Protected areas established in 1978